Singled Out was a comic strip in the UK comic The Beano. It first appeared in issue 3226, dated 15 May 2004, drawn by Mike Pearse.
Based on The Bash Street Kids, Singled Out focuses on one character each week and builds a one-page story around them.  Mike Pearse has also included other Beano faces in his strips such as Dennis the Menace, Bea and The Three Bears.

Pearse drew the strip until mid-2007, when the job was given to Nigel Parkinson, and then Tom Paterson. David Sutherland also drew a single strip. Paterson's trademark background images, such as the randomly positioned socks, are often included. The bottom left-hand corner of the page no longer shows which character the strip is focused on. Some strips mentioned which character was being featured in the header, but others didn't provide any information on this.  After the 2009 Bash Street Kids annual (Space Cadets) was published, Paterson's work on Singled Out was changed to be more like Pearse's style, where before it was akin to David Sutherland's style, while Nigel Parkinson drew it in the Beano's sister comic, BeanoMAX. Several of the early Mike Pearse stories were reprinted in the 2010 Bash Street Kids annual. The strip appeared on an increasingly less regular basis in 2009, and has since ended.  There was a Singled Out reprint strip shown a few years later (under the title Bash Street Capers), but this was (quite oddly as it was labelled No.1) a one-off.

References 

Beano strips
2004 comics debuts
2009 comics endings
Gag-a-day comics
British humour comics
Child characters in comics
Comics set in the United Kingdom
Comics spin-offs
The Bash Street Kids